William Henry "Harry" Lambright (born 1939) is a professor of Public Administration, International Affairs and Political Science at the Maxwell School of Citizenship and Public Affairs of Syracuse University.

He is the director of the Science and Technology Policy Program of the Center for Environmental Policy and Administration since 1995 and a Senior Research Associate at the Campbell Public Affairs Institute.

Early life and education
Lambright was born on July 9, 1939, in Baltimore, Maryland to William Henry Lambright and Nellie Mae Lambright (née: Brown). He graduated with an AB degree from Johns Hopkins University in 1961. In 1966, he earned a master's degree and a PhD at Columbia University. His thesis dealt with NASA and the politics of patents.

Career
In 1966, Lambright joined the Maxwell School of Citizenship and Public Affairs at Syracuse University, where he became full professor in 1976. He completed 55 years of service in 2021. He also held occasional positions at SUNY College of Environmental Science and Forestry and Cornell University.

Lambright has served as a guest scholar at the Brookings Institution (1965-1966); Special Assistant to the Office of University Affairs at NASA (1970); and as the director of the Science and Technology Policy Center at the Syracuse Research Corporation (1972-1994).

Lambright's research focuses on federal policy-making in the fields of space technology, national security, ecosystem management, biotechnology, space-exploration, transboundary issues, and science and policy integration. He has been interviewed by the media on variety of topics, including the environment, space science and technology, and government management.

Awards
Lambright became a fellow of the American Association for the Advancement of Science (AAAS) in 2004 for "his distinguished contributions to the field of science and technology policy, including issues involving space, environment, and transfer technology".

He was elected a fellow of National Academy of Public Administration in 2012. He is also a member of American Political Science Association, American Society for Public Administration (executive committee for public administration since 1987).

Works
Lambright has authored over 275 articles, papers, and reports and has written or edited eight books.

See also
 Space policy
 IBM Center for The Business of Government

References

External links
 Syracuse University Profile
 NASA Bio
 Profile by the IBM Center for The Business of Government

1939 births
Living people
Johns Hopkins University alumni
Columbia University alumni
Brookings Institution people
Syracuse University faculty
State University of New York College of Environmental Science and Forestry faculty
Cornell University faculty
Fellows of the American Association for the Advancement of Science
People from Baltimore
20th-century American educators
21st-century American educators
21st-century American scientists
20th-century American scientists